María Teresa is a 1972 Venezuelan telenovela written by Cuban writer Delia Fiallo and broadcast on Venevisión. The telenovela starred Lupita Ferrer and José Bardina as the main protagonists.

Plot
María Teresa is a beautiful and charming woman who lives with her sickly mother Magdalena and her hard-working father Antonio. María Teresa works at a flower shop and one day, she meets Román, a young man who plays piano at a restaurant nearby. They both fall in love with each other, though she doesn't know that he is actually a millionaire.

María Teresa tells her mother she has fallen in love with Román López Bello. Seeing she will die soon, she reveals to her husband Antonio that Teresa isn't his daughter but the daughter of her sister Eleonor who went to jail for the alleged murder of Román's father. but Eleonor wasn't responsible for his death but Alfredo Fuentes Tovar, his brother. Years later, Eleanor is released from jail and introduces herself as María Teresa's aunt. When María Teresa introduces Román to her, she recognizes the similarities he has with his father and afraid her secret will be known, tries to separate them. María Eugenia also is opposed to the relationship due to mere social prejudices. Alfredo who still lives with his sister tries to reconcile with Eleanor but she cannot forgive him because of his weakness in the past, and he mistakes Reina, her niece, to be their daughter.

Cast
 Lupita Ferrer- María Teresa Fuentes Tovar de López Bello/ Muñeca Montiel
 José Bardina- Román López Bello
 Ivonne Attas- Reina
 Jorge Félix- Hugo Falcon
 Reneé De Pallás- María Eugenia Fuentes Tovar Vda. de López Bello
 Eva Blanco- Leonor
 Orángel Delfín- Alfredo Fuentes Tovar
 Carlos Subero 
 Rebeca González- Any
 Néstor Zavarce- Santiago
 Betty Ruth
 Enrique Alzugaray
 Ana Castell
 Caridad Canelón
 Chumico Romero
 Martha Lancaste
 Jose Oliva
 Susana Duijm

Versions

References

External links
María Teresa at the Internet Movie Database

1972 telenovelas
Venevisión telenovelas
Spanish-language telenovelas
Venezuelan telenovelas
1972 Venezuelan television series debuts
1972 Venezuelan television series endings
Television shows set in Venezuela